This is a list of the National Register of Historic Places listings in Uvalde County, Texas.

This is intended to be a complete list of properties listed on the National Register of Historic Places in Uvalde County, Texas. There is one historic district and ten properties listed on the National Register in the county including one National Historic Landmark (NHL). The NHL site is also a State Antiquities Landmark and a Recorded Texas Historic Landmark (RTHL) while two additional properties are also RTHLs.

Current listings

The publicly disclosed locations of National Register properties may be seen in a mapping service provided.

|}

See also

National Register of Historic Places listings in Texas
Recorded Texas Historic Landmarks in Uvalde County

References

External links

Registered Historic Places
Uvalde County
Buildings and structures in Uvalde County, Texas